Madame Georges Charpentier and Her Children is an 1878 painting by Pierre-Auguste Renoir. The painting depicts Marguerite Charpentier and her children Georgette and Paul. The Metropolitan Museum of Art owns the painting. As typical of other portraits of women by Renoir, the piece includes details which "position" the subjects "in terms of wealth and status".  

The 1882 "imagery" of the painting The Daughters of Edward Darley Boit by John Singer Sargent has been compared to Madame Georges Charpentier and Her Children. Sargent had seen Madame Georges Charpentier and Her Children at the 1879 Salon. The 1923 painting Emma and Her Children by George Wesley Bellows has also been compared to Madame Georges Charpentier and Her Children. Sam Ratelle has said the painting inspired the Black Christian Siriano gown of Billy Porter worn by Porter at the 91st Academy Awards.

References

1878 paintings
Paintings by Pierre-Auguste Renoir
Paintings in the collection of the Metropolitan Museum of Art
Group portraits by French artists
Portraits of women
Paintings of children
19th-century portraits
Dogs in art